Celebrity Big Brother is the American adaptation of Celebrity Big Brother and second spin-off of the United States version of Big Brother. It premiered on CBS on February 7, 2018 as counterprogramming to the 2018 Winter Olympics. The series is hosted by Julie Chen Moonves, and is produced by Fly on the Wall Entertainment in association with Endemol Shine North America; Allison Grodner and Rich Meehan serve as executive producers.

The Celebrity HouseGuests for the first season were revealed during a live pre-show of the 2018 Grammy Awards on January 28, 2018. The first season began filming on January 31, 2018 and concluded twenty-six days later on February 25, 2018, when Marissa Jaret Winokur and Ross Mathews were announced as the winner and runner-up of the season, respectively. On May 5, 2018, CBS renewed the series for a second season, which premiered on January 21, 2019. Twelve HouseGuests were announced on January 13, 2019, during a commercial break of CBS's NFL football coverage. The second season lasted for twenty-nine days and ended on February 13, 2019, when Tamar Braxton won in a unanimous vote over Ricky Williams.

After a three-year hiatus the series was revived for a third season that premiered on February 2, 2022, this time as counterprogramming to the 2022 Winter Olympics. This is the first season to follow casting quotas for CBS, set in 2020, requiring at least half of the contracted celebrities to be black, indigenous, (and) people of color. The eleven HouseGuests were later revealed on January 26, 2022, during a commercial break for The Amazing Race. Twenty-nine days later on February 23, 2022, Miesha Tate defeated Todrick Hall in a 7 to 1 vote by the eliminated contestants.

Thirty-four participants have competed in Celebrity Big Brother, but Anthony Scaramucci was declared to be a fake HouseGuest as part of a twist. The series follows a format similar to the main edition in which players leave the game when they are "evicted" from the house by vote of their fellow HouseGuests. In 2018, Mathews and Jaret Winokur received their own aftershow, Off the Block with Ross and Marissa, that aired alongside the twentieth season of Big Brother. In addition, some of the contestants returned for the subsequent seasons of both the celebrity and civilian editions to host competitions. Brandi Glanville previously participated in the twentieth season of the United Kingdom's version of Celebrity Big Brother while Omarosa was a contestant in the Australian version of Celebrity Big Brother, entitled Big Brother VIP.

Contestants

Notes

Gallery

References

 
Celebrity Big Brother (American TV series)